Russini is a surname. Notable people with the surname include:
 Dianna Russini, American sports journalist
 Simone Russini (born 1996), Italian footballer